Vladimir Yevseyevich Zuev (January 29, 1925 – June 6, 2003) was a Soviet and Russian physicist, academician of the Academy of Sciences of the Soviet Union, Hero of Socialist Labour, USSR State Prize recipient, honorary citizen of Tomsk, expert in atmospheric physics and optics.

Memory

 A street in Tomsk has been named after Zuev (Area "Science").
 There is a monument to academician Vladimir Zuev in Tomsk Akodemgorodok

Publications
The author of 32 books and more than 600 scientific articles. The main work in the field of optics and atmospheric physics.

See also
Akademgorodok (Tomsk)

External links
 Tomsk Wiki
 Tomsk Wiki (In Russian)
 Tomsk Wiki (Google translation from Russian)

1925 births
2003 deaths
20th-century Russian physicists
People from Irkutsk Governorate
People from Irkutsk Oblast
Full Members of the Russian Academy of Sciences
Full Members of the USSR Academy of Sciences
Tomsk State University alumni
Academic staff of Tomsk State University

Eighth convocation members of the Supreme Soviet of the Soviet Union
Ninth convocation members of the Supreme Soviet of the Soviet Union
Tenth convocation members of the Supreme Soviet of the Soviet Union
Heroes of Socialist Labour
Recipients of the Medal of Zhukov
Recipients of the Order "For Merit to the Fatherland", 2nd class
Recipients of the Order "For Merit to the Fatherland", 3rd class
Recipients of the Order of Lenin
Recipients of the Order of the Red Banner of Labour
Recipients of the USSR State Prize
Russian physicists
Soviet physicists